Lithuania is scheduled to participate in the Eurovision Song Contest 2023 in Liverpool, United Kingdom, with "Stay" performed by Monika Linkytė. The Lithuanian broadcaster,  (LRT), used the national selection  2023 to select their representative.

Background 

Prior to 2023, Lithuania has participated in the Eurovision Song Contest twenty-two times since its first entry in 1994. LRT confirmed its participation in the Eurovision Song Contest 2023 in mid-July 2022. On 11 October 2022, the broadcaster announced that  had been confirmed for the fourth time in a row as the national final format used to select Lithuania's entry for the Eurovision Song Contest.

Before Eurovision

Pabandom iš naujo! 2023
 ("Let's try again! 2023") was the national final format developed by LRT in order to select Lithuania's entry for the Eurovision Song Contest 2023. The competition involved a five-week-long process that commenced on 21 January 2023 and concluded with a final on 18 February 2023. All shows took place at the LRT Studios in Vilnius.

Format 
For the 2023 competition, two heats consisting of fifteen entries each were held on 21 and 28, January where five entries from each heat were eliminated, while the remaining twenty entries participated in the competition's two semi-finals, taking place on 4 and 11 February. In each semi-final, ten entries participated and the top five proceeded to the final. In the final, the winner will be selected from the remaining ten entries. The results of each of the six shows were determined by the 50/50 combination of votes from a jury panel and public televoting.

The ranking developed by both streams of voting was converted to points from 1-8, 10 and 12 and assigned based on the number of competing songs in the respective show. During the first four shows, the jury votes were determined by a five-member panel. In the final, a nine-member panel will vote. The public could cast their votes through telephone and SMS voting, which were monitored by independent observers from auditor Grand Thornton Baltic, with a maximum of ten votes cast from one device. Ties in all shows were decided in favour of the entry that was awarded the most points by the jury. The composer of the winning song will receive a €5,000 cash prize.

Competing entries
On 11 October 2022, LRT opened a submission form for artists to apply with one song, with the deadline set for 12 December 2022. The broadcaster will allocate a budget of up to 1,500 euros to each participant, which the participants can use to prepare for the selection. On 20 December 2022, the list of the 30 participating artists and the titles of the songs was released by LRT. On 23 December 2022, Lina Štalytė was disqualified from the competition due to the song being previously published in 2020, and was replaced by the band The Pixls.

Shows

Heat 1 

The first heat of the competition aired on 21 January 2023 and featured fifteen of the competing artists. The show was filmed on 17 January 2023. 10 of the competing acts qualified to the semi-finals.

Heat 2 
The first heat of the competition aired on 28 January 2023 and featured fifteen of the competing artists. The show was filmed on 23 January 2023. 10 of the competing acts qualified to the semi-finals. The jury consisted of Ramūnas Zilnys (music reviewer), Ieva Narkutė (singer),  (composer), Stanislavas Stavickis-Stano (singer-songwriter) and Giedrė Kilčiauskienė (soloist, formerly member of an electronic band ).

Semi-final 1 
The first semi-final took place on 4 February 2023 and featured ten of the qualified artists. The show was filmed on 31 January 2023. Five of the competing acts qualified to the final.

Semi-final 2 
The second semi-final took place on 11 February 2023 and featured ten of the qualified artists. Five of the competing acts qualified to the final.

Final 
The final took place on 18 February 2023 and featured the ten qualified artists. In addition to the competing entries, Eurovision Song Contest 2023 Ukrainian representatives Tvorchi appeared as guests, and Eurovision Song Contest 2019 winner Duncan Laurence and Monika Liu performed as interval acts.

Ratings

At Eurovision 
According to Eurovision rules, all nations with the exceptions of the host country and the "Big Five" (France, Germany, Italy, Spain and the United Kingdom) are required to qualify from one of two semi-finals in order to compete for the final; the top ten countries from each semi-final progress to the final. The European Broadcasting Union (EBU) split up the competing countries into six different pots based on voting patterns from previous contests, with countries with favourable voting histories put into the same pot. On 31 January 2023, an allocation draw was held, which placed each country into one of the two semi-finals, and determined which half of the show they would perform in. Lithuania has been placed into the second semi-final, to be held on 11 May 2023, and has been scheduled to perform in the second half of the show.

References 

Countries in the Eurovision Song Contest 2023
Lithuania in the Eurovision Song Contest
Eurovision Song Contest